Vítor Hugo Encarnação Freitas (born 3 March 1996), known as Vítor Barata, is a Portuguese professional footballer who plays as a central midfielder for  club Nejmeh.

Club career
Early in his football career, Barata underwent trials with Portuguese giants Benfica and Sporting CP, with whom he signed in August 2011 at the age of 14. He spent two years with the club, playing at youth level. On 5 November 2014, Barata made his professional debut with Marítimo B in a 2014–15 Segunda Liga match against União Madeira. 

In July 2019, Barata signed a two-year contract with Greek Super League 2 side Ergotelis. 

On 5 February 2022, Barata joined Polish III liga club Stal Stalowa Wola. He made his debut in a friendly against Polonia Bytom and scored one goal.

On 6 July 2022, he returned to Greece to join Ágios Nikólaos.

References

External links

Stats and profile at LPFP 

1996 births
Living people
Sportspeople from Funchal
Portuguese footballers
Association football midfielders
Liga Portugal 2 players
Super League Greece 2 players
III liga players
Lebanese Premier League players
Ergotelis F.C. players
O.F. Ierapetra F.C. players
Trikala F.C. players
Stal Stalowa Wola players
Agios Nikolaos F.C. players
Nejmeh SC players
Portuguese expatriate footballers
Expatriate footballers in Greece
Expatriate footballers in Poland
Expatriate footballers in Lebanon
Portuguese expatriate sportspeople in Greece
Portuguese expatriate sportspeople in Poland
Portuguese expatriate sportspeople in Lebanon